Maddox is an unincorporated community in St. Mary's County, Maryland, United States.

References

Unincorporated communities in St. Mary's County, Maryland
Unincorporated communities in Maryland